"Pyramid Song" is a song by the English rock band Radiohead, released as the lead single from their fifth studio album, Amnesiac (2001). It features piano, strings, a "shuffling" rhythm and lyrics inspired by the Egyptian underworld. It was promoted with an animated music video.

After no singles were released from their previous album, Kid A (2000), "Pyramid Song" was Radiohead's first single since "No Surprises" (1998). It reached the top 10 on seven national charts, and was named one of the best tracks of the decade by Rolling Stone, NME and Pitchfork.

Writing and recording 
Following the tour for Radiohead's third album, OK Computer (1997), Radiohead's songwriter, Thom Yorke, bought a house in Cornwall and spent his time walking the cliffs and drawing, restricting his musical activity to playing his new grand piano. He wrote "Pyramid Song" and "Everything In Its Right Place" in the same week. For "Everything In Its Right Place", he programmed his playing into a synthesiser, but found that "Pyramid Song" sounded better untreated. He said of the composition: "The chords I'm playing involve lots of black notes. You think you're being really clever playing them but they're really simple."

Yorke said "Pyramid Song" was inspired by the song "Freedom" by the jazz musician Charles Mingus, released on the 1962 album The Complete Town Hall Concert. One version of "Pyramid Song" included similar handclaps, but, according to Yorke, they sounded "naff" and so he erased them. The lyrics were inspired by an exhibition of ancient Egyptian underworld art Yorke attended while Radiohead were recording in Copenhagen, and ideas of cyclical time found in Buddhism and discussed by Stephen Hawking.

According to a studio diary written by the guitarist Ed O’Brien, the basic track, consisting of vocals, piano and drums, was recorded on 8 December 1999. The strings, arranged by Jonny Greenwood, were recorded on 4 February 2000. They were performed by the Orchestra of St John's in Dorchester Abbey, a 12th-century church about five miles from Radiohead's studio in Oxfordshire. Greenwood instructed the players to swing in the style of jazz musicians. The isolated string part was included on the 2021 reissue Kid A Mnesia.

"Pyramid Song" uses an unusual rhythm and its time signature has the been subject of debate. According to Radiohead's drummer, Philip Selway, "Pyramid Song" is in swung 4/4; however, he said he "felt his way" through the drum part rather than count it. On the day of recording, Selway initially felt lost and that the session was going badly, but the drum part "fell into place" when he stopped trying to analyse the rhythm and instead responded to the inflections in Yorke's piano and vocals.

In a 2001 Rolling Stone interview, O'Brien said he felt "Pyramid Song" was Radiohead's best work. Selway said it "ran counter to what had come before in Radiohead in lots of ways ... The constituent parts are all quite simple, but I think the way that they then blend gives real depth to the song."

Composition 
"Pyramid Song" is an art rock song, with elements of jazz, classical and krautrock. According to the journalist Alex Ross, Yorke's piano chords are "laced with suspended tones" and "hang mysteriously in the air, somewhere between serenity and sadness". The strings play glissando harmonics and Selway plays a "shuffling" rhythm.

The ascending chord progression at the beginning of the song can also be heard in a section of Zoltan Kodaly's Psalmus Hungaricus. This is presumably a coincidence.

Critical reception 
NME named "Pyramid Song" their "single of the week", describing it as "malevolent, moving, epic". The Guardian named it "CD of the week", with critic Alexis Petridis describing it as "a beautiful, intricately wrought mesh of complex time signatures, keening vocals, elegiac strings and subtly disturbing audio effects". 

Rolling Stone placed "Pyramid Song" at number 94 on their list of the "100 Best Songs of the Decade", writing that it "might be [Yorke's] most blissful recorded moment". In October 2011, NME named it the 131st best track of the previous 15 years, calling it a "ghostly hymn of stunning beauty". Pitchfork named it the 59th-best track of the decade, describing it as "an absolutely singular track in a catalog with no shortage of standouts". In 2020, the Guardian named it the fourth-best Radiohead song, writing: "Lyrics alluding to Hermann Hesse’s Siddhartha, piano seemingly exhumed from ancient civilisation and a newly spiritual Yorke, swimming with 'black-eyed angels' and a shoal of exes towards some nebulous afterlife. Torture for some; otherwise, cult-making."

Commercial performance 
"Pyramid Song" was Radiohead's first single in three years, after none were released from their previous album Kid A (2000). It reached number five on the UK Singles Chart,  number one in Portugal, number two in Canada, number three in Norway, number six in Finland and Italy and number 10 in Ireland. It also reached the top 25 in Australia, France and the Netherlands. On the Eurochart Hot 100, it debuted and peaked at number 13.

Music video 
Radiohead released a computer-animated music video for "Pyramid Song", created by animation studio Shynola. In the video, inspired by a dream Yorke had, a scuba diver explores an undersea world and enters a submerged house.

Track listings 

UK CD1
 "Pyramid Song" – 4:51
 "The Amazing Sounds of Orgy" – 3:38
 "Trans-Atlantic Drawl" – 3:02

UK CD2
 "Pyramid Song" – 4:51
 "Fast-Track" – 3:17
 "Kinetic" – 4:06

UK and French 12-inch single
A1. "Pyramid Song" – 4:51
B1. "Fast-Track" – 3:17
B2. "The Amazing Sounds of Orgy" – 3:38

European maxi-CD single
 "Pyramid Song" – 4:51
 "The Amazing Sounds of Orgy" – 3:38
 "Trans-Atlantic Drawl" – 3:02
 "Kinetic" – 4:06

Japanese CD single
 "Pyramid Song" – 4:51
 "Fast-Track" – 3:19
 "The Amazing Sounds of Orgy" – 3:38
 "Trans-Atlantic Drawl" – 3:03
 "Kinetic" – 4:05

Personnel 
Adapted from the Amnesiac liner notes.

 Radiohead 
 Colin Greenwood
 Jonny Greenwood
 Ed O'Brien
 Philip Selway
 Thom Yorke

 Additional musicians 
 The Orchestra of St John's – strings
 John Lubbock – conducting

 Technical personnel 
 Nigel Godrich – production, engineering
 Radiohead – production
 Gerard Navarro – engineering assistance
 Graeme Stewart – engineering assistance
 Bob Ludwig – mastering

 Artwork 
 Stanley Donwood – pictures, design
 Thom Yorke (credited as "Tchocky") – pictures

Charts

Weekly charts

Year-end charts

Release history

Later uses 
An instrumental cover of this song features in the final episode of Westworld TV series.

References

External links 
 https://mtosmt.org/issues/mto.13.19.1/mto.13.19.1.hesselink.html

2001 singles
2001 songs
Animated music videos
Buddhism in music
Number-one singles in Portugal
Parlophone singles
Radiohead songs
Song recordings produced by Nigel Godrich
Songs about death
Songs written by Colin Greenwood
Songs written by Ed O'Brien
Songs written by Jonny Greenwood
Songs written by Philip Selway
Songs written by Thom Yorke